Archipsocus floridanus is a species of ancient barklouse in the family Archipsocidae. It is found in Central America, North America, and South America.

References

Archipsocidae
Articles created by Qbugbot
Insects described in 1953